Julia Soaemias Bassiana (180 – 11 March 222) was a Syrian noblewoman and the mother of Roman emperor Elagabalus, who ruled over the Roman Empire from 218 to 222. She was one of his chief advisors, initially with the support and accompaniment of her mother Julia Maesa. She and her mother guided the young emperor until growing unrest and a family division led to her son's replacement by her nephew Severus Alexander. Julia Soaemias was killed along with her son by the Praetorian Guard. 

Julia Soaemias was born and raised in Emesa, Syria and through her mother was related to the Royal family of Emesa, and through marriage, to the Severan dynasty of Ancient Rome.

Family
She was the first daughter of the powerful Syrian Roman noblewoman Julia Maesa and Gaius Julius Avitus Alexianus, sister of Julia Avita Mamaea, niece of Julia Domna, and a niece by marriage of Emperor Lucius Septimius Severus.

At some point, she married Syrian Equestrian and Politician Sextus Varius Marcellus, a native of Apamea. As members of the imperial Roman family of the Severan dynasty, they resided in Rome, and Julia's husband rose to the Roman senate. Julia bore Marcellus two children: one son whose name is unknown and another son called Sextus Varius Avitus Bassianus, who became the Roman emperor Elagabalus. Her husband died in c.215, during his time as Roman governor in Numidia. The recently widowed Soaemias and her two sons later dedicated to him a tombstone which was found in Velletri, not far from Rome. The tombstone has two preserved bilingual inscriptions in Latin and Greek. The inscriptions reveal his political career, his various titles, designations and distinctions he received.

In Rome

Background
In 217, her maternal cousin, the Roman emperor Caracalla, was killed and Macrinus ascended to the imperial throne. Her family was allowed to return to Syria with their enormous wealth, and they returned to Emesa. Back in Emesa, her son, Bassianus, ascended as the chief priest of the Syrian deity Elagabalus.

Restoration of the Severan dynasty

Using her enormous wealth and the claim that Caracalla had slept with her daughter and that the boy was his bastard, Julia Maesa, Soaemias's mother, persuaded soldiers from The Gallic Third Legion stationed near Emesa to swear loyalty to Bassianus. Later, Bassianus was invited alongside his mother and her daughters to the military camp, clad in imperial purple and crowned as emperor by the soldiers.
 
Cassius Dio records a different story, citing that Gannys, a "youth who has not yet reached manhood" and the lover of Soaemias was the reason for the revolt. Since the boy's father was no longer alive, Gannys acted as the boy's protector and foster father, and late at night, he dressed him in Caracalla's clothing and smuggled him to camp, without either Maesa or Soaemias's knowledge, and persuaded the soldiers to swear loyalty to him. But nonetheless the story is likely a fabrication, seeing as it is unlikely that Maesa, who has much to gain if her grandson would become emperor, would be totally unaware of the coup, but Herodian's story, which tells that the coup was handled by Maesa and her family alone is also unlikely, seeing that Dio's story tells that the boy later had the support of many Equestrians and Senators from Emesa, which was most likely.

Whatever the circumstances for Elagabalus's rise to the purple were, he later rode to battle against Macrinus, and entered the city of Antioch emerging as emperor, with Macrinus fleeing before being captured near Chalcedon and executed in Cappadocia.

Reign of Elagabalus

Thus, Bassianus emerged as emperor and was styled Marcus Aurelius Antoninus Augustus, with Soaemias, as his mother, styled as Iulia Soaemias Augusta. Elagabalus as emperor was mainly concerned with religious matters, and as sun worship had increased throughout the Empire since the reign of his maternal great-uncle by marriage, Septimius Severus, Elagabalus and his mother saw this as an opportunity to install Elagabal as the chief deity of the Roman pantheon. The god was renamed Deus Sol Invictus, meaning God of the Undefeated Sun, and was honored even above Jupiter. Elagabalus and his entourage spent the winter of 218 in Bithynia at Nicomedia, where the emperor's religious beliefs first presented themselves as a problem. The contemporary historian Cassius Dio suggests that Gannys was in fact killed by the new emperor because he pressured Elagabalus to live "temperately and prudently". To help Romans adjust to having an oriental priest as emperor, Julia Maesa (Soaemias's mother) had a painting of Elagabalus in priestly robes sent to Rome and hung over a statue of the goddess Victoria in the Senate House. This placed senators in the awkward position of having to make offerings to Elagabalus whenever they made offerings to Victoria.

The duo attempted to gain popularity with Roman religion, and as a token of respect, joined either Astarte, Minerva, or Urania to Elagabal as his consort. Julia Soaemias and her mother feature in literary accounts of Elagabaus's reign, and were credited with exercising much influence. Julia Soaemias and her mother significantly assisted the emperor, and appeared in the Senate beside Elagabalus during his adoption of Severus Alexander. She assumed the senatorial title of clarissima and also held a "Women's Senate" deciding on matters of fashion and protocol. She was honored with various titles, honours and privileges, including 'Augusta, mater Augusti' (Augusta, mother of Augustus) and 'Mater castrorum et senatus et totius domus divinae' (Mother of camp and the senate and the all divine house). Their rule was not popular, however, and soon discontent arose, mainly because of the strange sexual behaviour and the Eastern religious practices of Elagabalus. Elagabalus lost the favour of both the Praetorian Guard and the senate, mainly because of his many eccentricities. In particular his relationship with Hierocles increasingly provoked the Praetorians. When Elagabalus' grandmother Julia Maesa perceived that popular support for the emperor was waning, she decided that he and his mother, who had encouraged his religious practices, had to be replaced. As alternatives, she turned to her other daughter, Julia Avita Mamaea, and her grandson, the thirteen-year-old Severus Alexander.

Controversy and transition of power
Maesa arranged for Elagabalus to appoint his cousin Severus Alexander as his heir and to give him the title of Caesar. Alexander shared the consulship with the emperor that year. However, Elagabalus reconsidered this arrangement when he began to suspect that the Praetorian Guard preferred his cousin to himself.

Death
After failing in various attempts to slay his cousin, Elagabalus decided to strip Alexander of his titles and revoked his consulship. Elagabalus then invented the rumor that Alexander was near death, in order to see how the Praetorians would react. A riot ensued, and the Guard demanded to see Elagabalus and Alexander in the Praetorian camp. Julia Soaemias entered the camp to protect her son, but was slain along with Elagabalus by the Praetorian Guard in 222. Their bodies were dragged through the streets and disposed of in the Tiber River, and Julia Soaemias was later declared a public enemy and her name erased from all records.

Severan dynasty family tree

See also
Women in Ancient Rome
Severan dynasty family tree

References

 Scriptores Historiae Augustae, Julius Capitolinus, Opellius Macrinus ix; Aelius Lampridius, ''Antoninus Heliogabalus i–ii, iv, xvii–xviii.

External links

Livius.org: Julia Soaemias
Livius.org: Sextus Varius Marcellus
Coinage of Julia Soaemias

180 births
222 deaths
2nd-century Roman women
3rd-century Roman women
3rd-century executions
3rd-century women rulers
Emesene dynasty
People of Arab descent
Severan dynasty
Soaemias
Soaemias
Executed Syrian people
Soaemias
Soaemias